Victoria Kings FC is a Guyanese football club in Victoria. The club competes in the GFF Elite League, the top league of football in Guyana. They have a fierce rivalry with fellow eastern side, Buxton United. The club's motto is Discipline is the Gateway to Excellence.

References

Football clubs in Guyana